Spartansburg is a borough in Crawford County, in northwestern Pennsylvania, United States. The population was 281 at the 2020 census, down from 305 at the 2010 census.

Geography
Spartansburg is located near the northeast corner of Crawford County at  (41.821980, -79.685957). It is surrounded by Sparta Township, a separate municipality.

Route 77 passes through the center of the borough, leading northeast  to Corry and southwest  to Meadville, the Crawford County seat.

Natural Features
Spartansburg Borough is located on the glaciated plateau of northwestern Pennsylvania. The borough is drained by East Branch Oil Creek, which begins at the outlet of Clear Lake, an impoundment of Patrick Run and Stranahan Run. The lowest elevation in Spartansburg is  where East Branch Oil Creek flows south out of the borough.

Demographics

As of the census of 2000, there were 333 people, 130 households, and 93 families residing in the borough. The population density was 499.1 people per square mile (191.9/km²). There were 140 housing units at an average density of 209.8 per square mile (80.7/km²). The racial makeup of the borough was 100.00% White.

There were 130 households, out of which 34.6% had children under the age of 18 living with them, 59.2% were married couples living together, 7.7% had a female householder with no husband present, and 27.7% were non-families. 26.9% of all households were made up of individuals, and 14.6% had someone living alone who was 65 years of age or older. The average household size was 2.56 and the average family size was 3.06.

In the borough the population was spread out, with 26.4% under the age of 18, 6.9% from 18 to 24, 26.1% from 25 to 44, 24.6% from 45 to 64, and 15.9% who were 65 years of age or older. The median age was 39 years. For every 100 females there were 89.2 males. For every 100 females age 18 and over, there were 88.5 males.

The median income for a household in the borough was $26,731, and the median income for a family was $34,063. Males had a median income of $33,750 versus $27,656 for females. The per capita income for the borough was $16,035. About 14.7% of families and 13.7% of the population were below the poverty line, including 18.2% of those under age 18 and 26.0% of those age 65 or over.

Education
Spartansburg is served by the Corry Area School District. Schools include Corry Area Middle & High School.

Notable person
Ray Harroun, winner of the inaugural Indianapolis 500 in 1911.

In popular culture
Spartansburg appeared in the Discovery Channel show Dirty Jobs.

References

External links
Spartansburg community website
Corry Area School District

Populated places established in 1830
Boroughs in Crawford County, Pennsylvania
1830 establishments in Pennsylvania